Lactobacillus delbrueckii subsp. bulgaricus is a bacterial subspecies traditionally isolated from European yogurts. Lactobacillus bulgaricus GLB44 differs from the rest of the L. bulgaricus strains as it was isolated from the leaves of Galanthus nivalis (snowdrop flower) in Bulgaria.

General information: GLB44 
GLB44 is derived from the leaves of the snowdrop flower; it is the only known strain of this subspecies that has vegan origin (not from yogurt) available as a commercial probiotic. Probiotics are health promoting bacteria which, when consumed in adequate amounts, confer a benefit on the host, normally associated with positive effects on the digestive and immune systems, and are usually prescribed during or after antibiotic treatment to alleviate the symptoms of antibiotic-associated diarrhea. Probiotics are also associated with decreasing of the risk of traveler's diarrhea.

The snowdrop flower, found in European mountainous regions, flowers between January and May in nature, when the temperatures can fall below freezing in this region. Thus, GLB44 is capable of surviving in freezing temperatures. These characteristics of its natural habitat allows for GLB44 to survive and remain unaffected in foods that are plant based and stored in refrigerator temperatures.

GLB44 has inhibitory qualities against other bacteria such as E. Coli and Salmonella spp. A research study was completed by Harvard Medical School professor at Brigham and Women's Hospital, Andrew B. Onderdonk, PhD. Onderdonk's study revealed GLB44's strength and effectiveness against bacterial pathogens. GLB44 has patent pending status in the US for its pathogenic inhibitory qualities in vegan foods.

All other commercially available strains of L. bulgaricus are isolated from traditional yogurts and are grown in milk. Distinctly from the other L. bulgaricus, GLB44 grows very well in vegetable juices, given its natural plant habitat. Since all probiotics carry some of the organic matter in which they are grown, GLB44 carries traces of vegetable juice. GLB44 is currently grown in the European Union, in vegetable juice sourced from European farms that are GMO free.

GLB44 differs from other probiotics such as L. plantarum 299v or L. rhamnosus GG which are originally extracted from the human mouth. Others like Bifidobacterium are extracted from the feces of newborns, while others such as some strains of L. brevis come from the human vaginal canal. GLB44 does not have any interference with mammalian organs, only flowers, leaves and juices. This is important for multiple reasons such as the fact that there is some scientific evidence that if a probiotic grows in the human mouth naturally it could accelerate tooth decay.

Also while many probiotics have major allergens in the growth solution, GLB44 has no major allergens as part of its growth medium. For example, the growth medium for L. plantarum 299v includes barley that has small content of gluten, and L. rhamnosus GG has small content of casein. The fact that GLB44 is grown in vegetable juice means GLB44 does not contain any of the seven major allergens for which the U.S. Food and Drug Administration requires additional labelling: lactose, gluten, soya, peanuts, tree nuts, fish or crustacean shellfish.

It is estimated that 30 to 50 million Americans have some degree of lactose intolerance. Certain populations are more affected than others, including 75% of African American, Jewish, Mexican and Native American, and 90% of Asian population. Thus, having probiotic bacteria such as GLB44 without any lactose is especially important for the lactose sensitive population.

Another major difference is the safety track record of L. bulgaricus is now over 109 years since it was scientifically isolated. Even well-established probiotics such as L. rhamnosus and L. plantarum 299v have only a fraction of the safety record with 31 years and 21 years, respectively. On the other hand, there are certain similarities between L. bulgaricus GLB44 and some of the other probiotics. For example, L. bulgaricus, L. rhamnosus GG and L. plantarum 299v all have scientific records of their ability to pass successfully through the gastrointestinal tract. Also, they all have records of being able to inhibit to a degree pathogenic bacteria.

Finally, all three example probiotics in this comparison have all research tests performed by reputed academic professionals, for the case of GLB44, the research was performed by a Harvard Medical School professor, for the case of L. rhamnosus GG by two Tufts University professors, and for L. plantarum 299v by a professor at Lund University. All three probiotics have commercial brand names in the United States.

History of discovery: the bacillus of long life 

The first L. bulgaricus was discovered more than a century ago, the result of a study into the unusual longevity of mountain villagers in Bulgaria (thus called L. bulgaricus) by Dr. Stamen Grigorov in 1905. In 1912, the New York Times wrote an overview article about the new discovery and the use of fermented yogurts with L. bulgaricus in Bulgaria titled “Metchnikoff Confirmed in His Theory of Long Life,” highlighting villager baba Vasilka, age 126, as the longest living person in the world. In fact, in these Bulgarian communities there were 3,000 centenarians from a population of 3 million – six times higher than the number of centenarians per capita in the United States today. In the article the author described the discovery as follows: "In Bulgaria, the home of this bacillus, the majority of the natives live to age considerably in excess of what is recognized as the term of life among Western nations, an inquiry has shown that in the Eastern part of Southern Europe, among a population of about 3,000,000, there were more than 3,000 centenarians found performing duties which would not be assigned to a man of 65 years of age elsewhere. It is quite common to find among the peasants who live to such a large extent upon soured milk individuals of 110 and 120 years of age."

There is a complex interplay between the probiotic bacteria and the body's immune system in the large intestine, where the good bacteria stimulate the body's own immune system to inhibit the pathogenic bacteria. For example, in a controlled study, 61 elderly volunteers, after 6 months of a daily dose of L. bulgaricus, responded to the intake of probiotic with an increase in the percentage of NK cells, an improvement in the parameters defining the immune risk profile (IRP), and an increase in the T cell subsets that are less differentiated. The probiotic group also showed decreased concentrations of the pro-inflammatory cytokine IL-8 but increased antimicrobial peptide hBD-2.

GLB44 studies at Brigham and Women’s Hospital 
Dr. Andrew Onderdonk, a Pathology Professor at Harvard Medical School and a Director of the Clinical Microbiology Laboratory at Brigham and Women’s hospital has published one of his research tests on the following website: www.glb44.org, where GLB44 is tested against bacterial pathogens such as Salmonella sp. and E. Coli. In his study, both Salmonella sp. and E. Coli are inhibited when mixed with GLB44 in vegetable juice. The study confirms that GLB44 is a specific strain of the L. bulgaricus subspecies, and that its inhibitory power surpasses other L. bulgaricus strains.

Scientific studies on effects 
These studies do not involve significant human trials sufficient for the U.S. Food and Drug Administration to allow representative health claims, nevertheless, these studies, performed in reputable academic institutions, provide an insight on some of the properties of this bacteria:

The scientific study "In Vitro Cholesterol Uptake by Lactobacillus delbrueckii subsp. bulgaricus Isolates" performed at the University of Warsaw proved that L. bulgaricus has the ability to uptake cholesterol from its environment.
Helicobacter pylori bacterial infection is associated with chronic gastritis, peptic ulcer disease, and gastric cancer. The scientific study "Anti-Helicobacter pylori activity of Lactobacillus delbrueckii subsp. bulgaricus strains" performed by the Medical University of Sofia concluded that all tested L. bulgaricus strains inhibited a number of H. pylori strains.
In 2010, the British Journal of Nutrition reported a study that included fifty-seven elderly individuals (mean age 74) and eighty-five healthy individuals (mean age 67), who consumed L. bulgaricus every day over 12-week period. The result of the study clearly showed that people who consumed L. bulgaricus daily had 2.6 times lower incidence of catching a cold. The study concluded that the consumption of yogurt fermented with L. bulgaricus augmented natural killer cell activity and reduced the risk of catching the common cold in elderly individuals.
The Federal Research Centre for Nutrition in Germany reported that consuming L. bulgaricus on regular basis is associated with anticarcinogenic effects, one mechanism of which is the detoxification of genotoxins in the gut. This mechanism was shown experimentally in animals with use of the rat colon carcinogen, with endpoints that ranging from tumorigenesis to induction of DNA damage.
The Journal of Dairy Science reports that L. bulgaricus can act as a suppressant of allergic inflammation. Allergic inflammation is an important pathophysiological feature of several disabilities or medical conditions including allergic asthma, atopic dermatitis, allergic rhinitis and several ocular allergic diseases.
Clostridium difficile is the most common cause of Antibiotic-associated diarrhea, and the resulting C. difficile mediated infection (CDI) is potentially deadly. C. difficile associated diarrhea (CDAD) is manifested by severe inflammation and colitis, mostly due to the release of two exotoxins by C. difficile that cause destruction of epithelial cells in the intestine. The study “Lactobacillus delbrueckii ssp. bulgaricus B-30892 can inhibit cytotoxic effects and adhesion of pathogenic Clostridium difficile to Caco-2 cells  “demonstrates that L. bulgaricus can reduce the colonization of C. difficile cells in colorectal cells, and thus prevent Antibiotic Associated Diarrhea.

Safety of use 
Due to more than a century of safe use, the FDA has granted L. bulgaricus a "grandfather" status, with an automatic GRAS status (Generally Recognized as Safe). Moreover, the Code of Federal Regulations mandates that in the US, for a product to be called yogurt, it must contain two specific strains of lactic acid bacteria: Lactobacillus bulgaricus and Streptococcus thermophilus, as regulated by the FDA.

Even as a direct supplement, L. bulgaricus has a track record of safe use for more than 60 years in the United States. For example, the supplement Lactinex with a different strain of L. bulgaricus has been marketed as a commercial product in the US market since 1952.

For the last 100 years there has been not a case of overdose on probiotics, which substantiates L. bulgaricus GLB44 as an extremely safe product, without limitations of the quantity consumed. It is also recommendable for the elderly as it helps reduce infections such as the common cold, as well as for young children (i.e., when they suffer from acute diarrhea). Harvard Women's Health Watch, published by Harvard Medical School, recommends a GLB44 dose range of between 1 and 10 billion colony forming units (CFU) per day, the amount contained in a capsule or two several days a week.

GLB44 is not a bacterium that can live naturally in the human mouth, as presented by the Human Oral Microbiome Database. A study conducted by the University of Texas uncovered that while a bacterium called S. mutans is the biggest culprit for tooth decay, various lactobacilli are also associated with the progression of lesions. GLB44 does not increase the risk of tooth decay due to its inability to live in the human mouth, an advantage versus other probiotics that contain any of the following lactobacilli that live naturally in the human mouth and could contribute to the tooth decay: L. acidophilus, L. brevis, L. casei, L. fermentum, L. gasseri, L. paracasei, L plantarum, L. reuteri, L. rhamnosus, L. salivarius

L. bulgaricus GLB44 and the definition of probiotics 
The U.S. Food and Drug Administration (FDA) has presented on their website the following guideline: “Guidance for Industry on Complementary and Alternative Medicine Products and Their Regulation by the Food and Drug Administration” In this article, the definition of "Probiotics" is twofold: 1) live microbial food supplements that beneficially affect the host by improving its intestinal microbial; 2) live microorganisms which, when consumed in adequate amounts of food, confer a health benefit on the host.

Another guideline presented on the FDA website "Guidelines for Evaluation of Probiotics in Food" has outlined more specific criteria for the definition of effective probiotic based on the following criteria:
 Resistance to gastric acidity 
 Bile acid resistance 
 Adherence to mucus and/or human epithelial cells and cell lines 
 Antimicrobial activity against potentially pathogenic bacteria 
 Ability to reduce pathogen adhesion to surfaces 
 Bile salt hydrolase activity
Of note, the authors of this guideline specifically outline L. bulgaricus as an example of an effective probiotic with suitable scientific substantiation of health benefits.

Resistance to gastric acid and bile acid are scientifically presented in the following studies where L. bulgaricus successfully passes through the human intestinal tract, maintaining its viability: “Survival of Yogurt Bacteria in the Human Gut” and “Lactobacillus delbrueckii subsp. bulgaricus Collection to select a strain able to survive to the human intestinal tract.”. Adherence to mucus and human epithelial cells and cell lines and the ability to reduce pathogen adhesion to surfaces is scientifically proven by the research "Influence of Gastrointestinal System Conditions on Adhesion of exopolysaccharide-producing Lactobacillus delbrueckii subsp. bulgaricus strains to Caco-2 Cells"

There are also numerous studies that outline the antimicrobial activity of L. bulgaricus against potentially pathogenic bacteria such as E. Coli, Salmonella sp., S. aureus, V. cholera, B. subtilis, C. difficile and others.

Thus, the L. bulgaricus meets all the criteria of the FDA probiotic guideline, with scientific evidence supporting the strain as the clearest example of a safe and effective probiotic food supplement.

References

Lactobacillaceae